Hydrobiusini is a tribe in the subfamily Hydrophilinae of aquatic beetles, and containing 47 species in 9 genera.

Genera
 Ametor
 Hybogralius
 Hydramara
 Hydrobius
 Hydrocassis
 Limnocyclus
 Limnohydrobius
 Limnoxenus
 Sperchopsis

References

Polyphaga tribes
Hydrophilinae